Lloyd Read (born November 29, 1990) is a Welsh racing driver who has lived in California since childhood.

Born in Newport, Read moved to the United States at the age of six. He raced karts in both the UK and the USA. In 2011 he began racing in Sports Car Club of America amateur competition in Formula Enterprises. He also made his Star Mazda Championship debut. In 2012 he placed second in the Formula Car Challenge driving a Star Mazda car and made two Star Mazda Championship starts. In 2013 Read competed in the Pro Mazda Championship (formerly Star Mazda) full-time for JDC MotorSports. Read placed eighth in points with a best finish of fourth in race 1 in Toronto. On November 18, 2013, Read announced that he would compete in Indy Lights in 2014 with Bryan Herta Autosport/Jeffrey Mark Motorsport.

Read attended Saint Mary's College of California and resides in Danville, California.

Racing record

Pro Mazda Championship

Indy Lights

 Season still in progress.

References

External links
 
 
 
 

1990 births
Living people
Sportspeople from Newport, Wales
People from Danville, California
Welsh expatriates in the United States
Welsh racing drivers
Indy Pro 2000 Championship drivers
Indy Lights drivers
Bryan Herta Autosport drivers
JDC Motorsports drivers